{{Infobox film
| name           = Matewan
| image          = Matewan poster.jpg
| caption        = Theatrical release poster
| alt            = 
| director       = John Sayles
| producer       = Peggy RajskiMaggie Renzi
| writer         = John Sayles
| starring       = 
| music          = Mason Daring
| cinematography = Haskell Wexler
| editing        = Sonya Polonsky
| distributor    = Cinecom Pictures
| released       = 
| runtime        = 132 minutes
| country        = United States
| language       = English
| budget         = $4 million(estimated)<ref name="sayles">Gerry Molyneaux, "John Sayles, Renaissance Books, 2000 p 155.</ref>
| gross          = under $2 million (US)
}}Matewan is a 1987 American drama film written and directed by John Sayles, and starring Chris Cooper (in his film debut), James Earl Jones, Mary McDonnell and Will Oldham, with David Strathairn, Kevin Tighe and Gordon Clapp in supporting roles. The film dramatizes the events of the Battle of Matewan, a coal miners' strike in 1920 in Matewan, a small town in the hills of West Virginia.Matewan was a critical success but a box office flop, grossing under $2 million on an estimated $4 million budget. The film received a nomination for the Academy Award for Best Cinematography, and received a Criterion Collection re-release in 2019.

Plot
Joe Kenehan is an organizer for the United Mine Workers. He arrives in Matewan, West Virginia in 1920 to organize miners against the Stone Mountain Coal Company. His introduction to the town is his witnessing of a mob of miners angry at wage cuts beating up black miners who intended to cross the picket line. He takes up residence at a boarding house run by a coal miner's widow, Elma Radnor, and her 15-year-old son, Danny, who is also a miner and a budding Baptist preacher. The miners are reluctant to bring the imported workers, both black and Italian into their union, a cause not helped by C. E. Lively, a spy for the company within the union, who tries to goad the miners into violence and secretly informs the Baldwin–Felts Detective Agency of the "red" Kenehan's presence.

The next day, two Baldwin–Felts men, Hickey and Griggs, show up in town and take up residence at the Radnor boarding house. Danny at first refuses to give rooms to Hickey and Griggs, but Kenehan voluntarily moves to the hotel, freeing up a room for the two men and averting trouble for Mrs. Radnor. Hickey and Griggs then start their campaign against the union by forcibly evicting miners from company-owned houses in town. Mayor Testerman and Police Chief Sid Hatfield refuse to let them be evicted without eviction writs from Charleston. Hatfield deputizes all the men in town and tells them to go home and come back with their guns.

The Baldwin–Felts men then turn their attention on the strikers' camp outside town, where the miners and their families are living in tents. At night, the armed strikebreakers fire shots into the camp, injuring some strikers. The next day, they enter the camp to demand that all food and clothing purchased at the company store with scrip be turned over to them, but are thwarted by the arrival of armed hill people, whose land was taken by the coal company. Expressing disdain for the noise caused by the gunmen's automobile the night before, their presence and sympathy for the miners compels the Baldwin–Felts men to leave empty-handed. The slow arrival of the union's thinly stretched strike funds tests the patience of Danny Radnor and other miners who become disillusioned and turn to violence in spite of Kenehan's warnings. The miners are involved in a night-time shootout with the agents and Sephus is wounded. He is rescued by some hill people but not before he recognizes Lively as the infiltrator.

Lively tries to drive a wedge between Kenehan and the miners by convincing a young widow, Bridey Mae Tolliver, to falsely accuse Kenehan of sexual assault, and he plants a letter which makes Kenehan appear to be the infiltrator, leading the miners to plot to kill Kenehan. Danny overhears Hickey and Griggs talking about the scheme and is discovered and threatened by Hickey. That night, while preaching at the Freewill church, Danny relates a parable about Joseph that convinces the miners that they have been deceived by a false story, taking advantage of the now-inebriated detectives. Lively silently slips out of the back of the church while a miner runs to the camp to stop Few Clothes from killing Kenehan. Meanwhile, Sephus has made his way back to town and informed the others of Lively's betrayal, furiously burning down his restaurant. Lively flees town by swimming across the Tug Fork River.

Later, while Danny and his friend Hillard Elkins are stealing coal from the mine, they are confronted by the detectives. Danny hides, while Elkins is tortured for information. He provides five names, and is killed by Griggs anyway. Lively mentions that the men he has named died in the mines years ago, and muses that the death of a young boy will complicate things.

The situation between the Baldwin–Felts men and Chief Hatfield reaches a boiling point with the arrival of reinforcements with orders to carry out the evictions. The mayor tries to negotiate as Kenehan comes running to try to stop the fight. The sudden movement sets off a climactic gunfight between the exposed mercenaries and the armed townspeople firing from barricades and rooftops. Hatfield shoots two men and survives the battle, but Kenehan is killed and the mayor is shot in the stomach. Griggs is brought down, while Hickey escapes to Elma Radnor's boarding house, where he is shot and killed by Elma Radnor. Seven Baldwin–Felts men and two townspeople are ultimately killed.

In the epilogue, the narrator (revealed to be an elderly Danny recalling those days in "Bloody Mingo") recounts that Mayor Testerman succumbed to his wounds and the mayor's wife married Chief Sid Hatfield. But Hatfield was later gunned down in broad daylight on the steps of the McDowell County Courthouse in Welch, with Lively stepping up to deliver the coup de grâce. He recalls the event as the start of the Great Coalfield War.

Cast

 Chris Cooper as Joe Kenehan
 James Earl Jones as "Few Clothes" Johnson
 Mary McDonnell as Elma Radnor
 Will Oldham as Danny Radnor
 David Strathairn as Police Chief Sid Hatfield
 Ken Jenkins as Sephus Purcell
 Gordon Clapp as Griggs
 Kevin Tighe as Hickey
 John Sayles as Hardshell Preacher
 Bob Gunton as C.E. Lively
 Josh Mostel as Mayor Cabell Testerman
 Nancy Mette as Bridey Mae Tolliver
 Jace Alexander as Hillard Elkins
 Joe Grifasi as Fausto
 Maggie Renzi as Rosaria
 Jo Henderson as Mrs. Elkins
 Gary McCleery as Ludi

Reception
Critical responseVariety praised the acting in the film, writing, "Matewan is a heartfelt, straight-ahead tale of labor organizing in the coal mines of West Virginia in 1920 that runs its course like a train coming down the track. Among the memorable characters is Joe Kenehan (Chris Cooper), a young union organizer who comes to Matewan to buck the bosses. With his strong face and Harrison Ford good-looks, Cooper gives the film its heartbeat...Most notable of the black workers is 'Few Clothes' Johnson (James Earl Jones), a burly good-natured man with a powerful presence and a quick smile. Jones' performance practically glows in the dark. Also a standout is Sayles veteran David Strathairn as the sheriff with quiet integrity who puts his life on the line."

Film critic Vincent Canby lauded the acting and the cinematography in the film and wrote in his review, "There's not a weak performance in the film, but I especially admired the work of Mr. Cooper, Mr. Tighe, Miss McDonnell, Miss Mette, Mr. Gunton, Mr. Strathairn and Mr. Mostel. They may be playing Social-Realist icons, but each manages to make something personal and idiosyncratic out of the material, without destroying the ballad-like style.  For the most part, Haskell Wexler's photography doesn't go overboard in finding poetry in the images."

Critic Desson Howe liked the look of the film and wrote, "Cinematographer Haskell Wexler etches the characters in dark charcoal against a misty background. You get the feeling of dirt, sweat and – despite the story's mythic intentions – the grim grey struggle of it all. And Sayles, struggling for authority from Return of the Secaucus 7 through The Brother from Another Planet, has finally tapped the vein."

Jonathan Rosenbaum called Matewan a "simpleminded yet stirring" film which "offers a bracing alternative to complacent right-wing as well as liberal claptrap. If Sayles’s bite were as lethal as his bark, he might have given this a harder edge and a stronger conclusion."

The review aggregator Rotten Tomatoes reported that 94% of critics gave the film a positive review, based on 34 reviews.

 Accolades 
Cinematographer Haskell Wexler received an Academy Award nomination for Best Cinematography at the 50th Academy Awards.

In 2011, Empire'' ranked the film at number 21 on its list of the 50 Greatest American Independent Movies. Its description read, "The film not only marked a significant turning point in Sayles’ career (it was his first film to attract anything like a mainstream audience), it's arguably an even more relevant, cautionary tale today than it was during the Reagan/Thatcher controlled-climate of its release year."

Locations
The film was made in West Virginia with the town of Thurmond standing in for Matewan. Other scenes were filmed along the New River Gorge National River.

Soundtrack
The film score features Appalachian music of the period composed and performed by Mason Daring, who frequently works on John Sayles' films. West Virginia bluegrass singer Hazel Dickens sings the film's title track, "Fire in the Hole", and appears in the film as a member of the Freewill Baptist Church whose voice is heard leading the congregation in an a cappella hymn ("What A Friend We Have in Jesus") and also sings over the grave of a fallen union miner, Hillard Elkins, ("Gathering Storm"). Dickens also sings "Hills of Galilee" over the closing credits.

The soundtrack was released on LP by Columbia.
Other performers are John Hammond, Phil Wiggins (harmonica); Gerry Milnes, Stuart Schulman (fiddle), Jim Costa (mandolin); John Curtis (guitar), and Mason Daring (guitar, dobro).

References

External links

 
 
 
 
 
 Blair Community Center and Museum to preserve the story of the West Virginia Mine Wars
 Matewan film trailer at YouTube
Matewan: All We Got in Common an essay by A. S. Hamrah at the Criterion Collection

1987 films
1987 drama films
1987 independent films
American political drama films
Coal mining in Appalachia
Coal Wars
Films about the labor movement
Drama films based on actual events
Films directed by John Sayles
Films set in Appalachia
Films set in the 1920s
Films set in West Virginia
Films shot in West Virginia
Goldcrest Films films
History of labor relations in the United States
Industrial Workers of the World in fiction
Pocahontas Coalfield
Rail transport films
Films with screenplays by John Sayles
Films about mining
Films scored by Mason Daring
Labor disputes in West Virginia
United Mine Workers of America
1980s English-language films
1980s American films